The  is a type of 2-10-4 steam locomotive built by the Japanese Government Railways (JGR). They were numbered E10 1-E10 5 . They were built in 1948 and designed by Hideo Shima . 

Following the end of World War II Japanese Government Railways was prohibited by GHQ from building new locomotives due to financial difficulties. However, an exception was granted for the E10s to replace the ageing JNR Class 4110 locomotives. This was because it was not possible to substitute existing locomotives on the steep gradients of the Ōu Main Line where the 4110s were used. 

The boiler of the E10 was a special design based on the JNR Class D52 with the fire grate area reduced by 0.55m2.

Five locomotives were manufactured by Kisha Seizō in 1948. They were the last steam locomotives built for Japanese National Railways.

The last examples in regular service were withdrawn in 1962.

Preserved examples
One E10 remains in preservation: E10 2 at Ome Railway Park in Ōme, Tokyo.

See also
 Japan Railways locomotive numbering and classification

References

2-10-4 locomotives
Steam locomotives of Japan
1067 mm gauge locomotives of Japan
Preserved steam locomotives of Japan
Railway locomotives introduced in 1948
Freight locomotives